Jan Edmund Nyheim (born 6 October 1933) is a Norwegian diplomat.

He was born in Fræna, and is a cand.jur. by education. He started working for the Norwegian Ministry of Foreign Affairs in 1961. He was a special adviser in polar affairs from 1983, and deputy under-secretary of state in the polar department in 1984. He then served as the Norwegian ambassador to Canada from 1987 to 1993, to Italy from 1993 to 1996 and to Spain from 1996 to 2000.

References

1933 births
Living people
People from Fræna
Norwegian civil servants
Ambassadors of Norway to Canada
Ambassadors of Norway to Italy
Ambassadors of Norway to Spain